Valérie Bonnier is a French actress, screenwriter, and novel writer who played Fabienne in the 1977 film The Man Who Loved Women.
She writes for theatre, TV, radio, cinema, and novels.

Novelist :
 Toutes les rousses ne sont pas des sorcières - Éditions du Rocher, 2007
 Toutes les blondes ne sont pas des anges - Éditions du Rocher, 2008
 Toutes les rousses ne sont pas des tigresses - Éditions du Rocher, 2009
 10 histoires d'amour, nouvelles - Éditions Val & Paul, e-book, 2013
 L'homme idéal s'appelle Paul - Éditions Val & Paul, e-book, 2013
 Confidences érotiques d'une courtisane - Éditions France Empire, 2014

Theatre writer :
L'escapade - Éditions Arts et Comédie, 2012

Radio writer : 
27 radio plays and 4 news, France-Inter

Cinema writer :
Il y a des jours et des lunes - Claude Lelouch, 1990

TV writer :
IMDb

website : Personal website

References

Living people
French film actresses
Year of birth missing (living people)